Events in 2012 in Japanese television.

Events
March

Debuts

Ongoing
Music Fair, music (1964–present)
Sazae-san, anime (1969–present)
FNS Music Festival, music (1974–present)
Panel Quiz Attack 25, game show (1975–present)
Soreike! Anpanman. anime (1988–present)
Downtown no Gaki no Tsukai ya Arahende!!, game show (1989–present)
Crayon Shin-chan, anime (1992–present)
Nintama Rantarō, anime (1993–present)
Chibi Maruko-chan, anime (1995–present)
Detective Conan, anime (1996–present)
SASUKE, sports (1997–present)
Ojarumaru, anime (1998–present)
One Piece, anime (1999–present)
Doraemon, anime (2005–present)
Naruto Shippuden, anime (2007–present)
Fairy Tail, anime (2009-2013)
Toriko, anime (2011-2014)
Hunter × Hunter, anime (2011-2014)

Resuming

Endings

Technology
 March 31 – Terrestrial analog television is abandoned at Iwate, Miyagi and Fukushima.

See also
 2012 in anime
 2012 Japanese television dramas
 2012 in Japan
 2012 in Japanese music
 List of Japanese films of 2012

References